The 2017–18 Stony Brook Seawolves women's basketball team will represent Stony Brook University during the 2017–18 NCAA Division I women's basketball season. The Seawolves, led by fourth year head coach Caroline McCombs, play their home games at the Island Federal Credit Union Arena and are members in the America East Conference.

Media
All non-televised home games and conference road games will stream on either ESPN3 or AmericaEast.tv. Most road games will stream on the opponents website. All games will have an audio broadcast streamed online through the Pack Network.

Roster

Schedule

|-
!colspan=9 style="background:#; color:white;"| Exhibition

|-
!colspan=9 style="background:#; color:white;"| Non-conference regular season

|-
!colspan=9 style="background:#; color:white;"| America East regular season

|-
!colspan=9 style="background:#; color:white;"| America East Women's Tournament

See also
 2017–18 Stony Brook Seawolves men's basketball team

References

Stony Brook Seawolves women's basketball seasons
Stony Brook Seawolves women's basketball team
Stony Brook Seawolves women's basketball team
Stony Brook Seawolves women's basketball team